Italian beat is the Italian form of beat music, circa 1965 to 1972, inspired mainly by British popular music of the 1960s.

Rock in Italy 

Italy is iconic worldwide for his mainstream "neapolitan" melodic singing style, and historically, very xenophile but quite slowly receptive to musical influences from abroad.

State (then monopolistic) radio and TV, and domestic show-business executives were lukewarm, or frankly hostile to the early rock'n'roll wave of the 1950s.

Rock and roll was seen as a gimmick, or just noise for "teddy-boys" (actual term for young rogues) taste; only some mild-mannered "modern-style" singers (like Tony Renis of "When, when, when" fame) were allowed to be aired, publish records with main labels, and participate in the institutional "Festival di Sanremo" contest.

The early pioneers of rock'n'roll (so-called urlatori) had some media coverage as novelties, but soon, those who wanted to pursue a career in music business had to switch toward the traditional mainstream.

From 1961 to 1965, teenagers-oriented music was a mix of pretty-face pop, twist and French yé-yé influences.

Situation changed slightly around 1965. Notably:

Some visiting top acts, like the Beatles or the Rolling Stones

The creation of "Whiskey-a-Go-go" or "Marquee" styled rock clubs (such as Rome's Piper Club, Milan's Paip's, and Piper 2000 on the Tuscan Riviera), was soon imitated in smaller towns.

The infamous "disc-eater", a cheap 45 RPM player, that strongly boosted singles sales, and the massive diffusion of juke-boxes.

The emergence of contests and festivals, friendly to new trends, like the Cantagiro, or Davoli Contest (sponsored by instrument manufacturers and distributors).

The easy reception of powerful medium-wave foreign stations like Radio Luxembourg, Radio Montecarlo or Radio Koper allowed Italian youngsters to bypass the mediatic block, and stay updated to the latest anglosaxon trends (some radio enthusiasts even managed to catch the elusive Channel's "pirate stations" like Radio Caroline, and German TV shows such as Beat Club).

Under music executives' pressure, the state broadcaster RAI reluctantly agreed to pay some attention to the "beat" hype, and the upcoming soul/R&B vogue.

Beat groups

Research estimates the number of small groups active in Italy in 1963 — either pro or amateur, including jazz — at around 300; it jumped to 1500+ in 1968.

Some groups had the chance to hit the domestic charts, and to be remembered today, including Dik-Dik, Stormy Six, Equipe 84, Nomadi, and the New Trolls.

The New Dada band had the honour to open for the Beatles in their 1965 Italian mini-tour.

Usual differences, disputes and especially the national military service led to a premature end for the vast majority of them.

Virtually no popular Italian singer or group of the Beat era had any success outside Italy, except in some Spanish-speaking countries. This is due to their local scope, often imposed by managers; few singers were fluent in English, and "sing Italian" was the rule.

Most bands which survived to the early 1970s switched to melodic mainstream or prog-pop, and only a few are still active with at least one original member, though some acts had brief revivalist reincarnations.

Some popular actors and TV personalities started their career in show-business as a component of an Italian beat group

The "Brit-It" invasion 

Some British pop acts, unable, or unwilling to face the strong domestic competition, opted to move and stay in Italy, where they were revered as "British original" numbers. Many of them spent all their career in Italy, and thus are well remembered there, but virtually unknown in their homeland. These bands developed a peculiar style, singing usually in Italian with a strong British accent.
  
The top bands were arguably Shel Shapiro & the Rokes, and Mal Ryder & the Primitives, who had several Italian hit singles. Other popular acts include Bad Boys, Thane Russall, Mike Liddell, Kim Brown & the Renegades, the Senate; the Motowns, fronted by Lally Stott; and the Sorrows, the only band to have also had some chart success in UK.

References 

Italian music